Abdollah Eskandari (also Romanized as Abdollāh Eskandari; born 18 October 1945) is an Iranian make-up artist.

Bio
Abdollah Eskandari is a make-up artist who teaches and designs make-up.
He has worked in the capacity of make-up artist in over 170 feature films, over 20 historical TV series, and a number of theater and opera performances.
Eskandari has also designed and performed make-up in France, Germany, Yugoslavia, Syria, Jordan, Morocco, UAE, and Malaysia.

A statue of Eskandari was unveiled at the Iran Television and Cinema Town in Tehran in 2019.

Films 
 Personal Life (original title: Zendegie Khososi) | 2011 
 A Cube of Sugar (original title: Ye habe ghand) | 2011 
 A simple love Story (original title: Yek Asheghaneye Sadeh) | 2011 
 The second End (original title: Payan-e Dovom) | 2010 
 Carousel (original title: Charkh o Falak) | 2010 
 Dokhtar-e Shah-e Parion | 2010 
 Hello To love (original title: Salam Bar Eshgh) | 2009 
 Aghaye Haft Rang| 2008 
 Chehel Salegi | 2008 
 Heart Broken (original title: Del shekasteh) | 2008 
 The Hunter (original title: Shekarchi) | 2008 
 There's Always a Woman in Between (original title: Hamisheh paye yek zan dar mian ast) | 2008 
 The wall (original title: Divar) | 2008 
 The women are angels (original title: Zanha fereshtehand) | 2007 
 Kalagh Par | 2007 
 Taxi Driver (original title: Ranandeh Taxi) | 2006 
 Soghate farang | 2006 
 Unexpected (original title: Gheir-e Montazereh) | 2006 
 Guest (original title: Mehman) | 2006 
 It's winter (original title: Zemestan ast)| 2006 
 Gone with the wind (original title bar bawd rafteh) | 2005 
 Poet of the Wastes (original title: Shaere zobale-ha) | 2005 
 The pink Wedding (original title: Ezdevaj-e Sorati) | 2004 
 The Color Purple (original title: Be Rang-e Arghavan) | 2004 
 Charlatan | 2004 
 The Runaway Bride (original title: Arouse farari) | 2004 
 Ghoroob Shod bia | 2004 
 The Mask (original title: Neghab) | 2004 
 A slice of Bread (original title: Yek teke nan) | 2004 
 Tara and the Strawberry Fever (original title: tara va tab-e toot farangi) | 2003 
 The Silent King (original title: Shah-e khamoosh) | 2003 
 Coma | 2003 
 The Fever (original title: Tab) | 2003 
 Inja cheraghi roshan ast| 2002 
 yellow rose (original title: Roz-e zard) | 2002 
 The felicific Bride (original title: Aroos-e Khosh Ghadam) | 2002 
 Atash | 2002 
 Zamaneh | 2001 
 Khakestari | 2001 
 Ab va Atash | 2001 
 Passenger From Rey (original title: Mosafere rey) | 2000 
 Swan Song (original title: Avaz-e ghoo) | 2000 
 Rely on the wind (original title: Tekyeh bar Baad) | 2000 
 Dokhyari be nam-e Tondar | 2000 
 The Nights of Tehran (original title: Shabhaye Tehran) | 2000 
 The Day I Became a Woman (original title: Roozi ke zan shodam) | 2000 
 Kandahar (original title: Safar e Ghandehar) | 2000 
 Maturity (original title: Bolugh) | 2000 
 The Actor (original title: Bazigar) | 1999 
 Friends (original title: Doostan) | 1999 
 Ranger | 1999 
 Tehran, New Age (original title: Tehran, Roozegar-e no) | 1999 
 Eshghe Taher | 1999 
 Baanoo | 1999 
 Malek Khatoon | 1999 
 Victorious warrior (original title: Jangjoo-ye pirooz) | 1998 
 Island stories (First Episode: The lost cousin (original title: Dastan-haye Jazire (Epizod-e Aval: Dokhtar daee-ye Gomshodeh)) | 1998 
 The Girl in the Sneakers (original title: Dokhtari ba kafsh-haye-katani) | 1998 
 Heeva | 1998 
 The Pear Tree (original title: Derakhte Golabi) | 1998 
 Claws in the Dust (original title: Panje dar khak) | 1997 
 Pilot (original title: Khalaban) | 1997 
 The Fifth Season (original title: Fasl-e Panjom) | 1997 
 Komakam kon | 1997 
 Komiteh mojazat | 1997 
 Zakhmi | 1997 
 The Upside down world | 1996 
 Sahereh | 1996 
 Aghrab | 1996 
 Javanmard | 1996 
 Counterattack (original title: patak) | 1996 
 Lost Love (original title: Eshghe Gomshodeh) | 1995 
 The SandStorm (original title: Toofan-e Shen) | 1995 
 Adam barfi | 1995 
 Chehreh | 1995 
  | 1995 
 Nejatyaftegan | 1995 
 Pari | 1995 
 Reyhaneh | 1995 
 The Fateful Day (original title: Ruz-e vagh'e) | 1995 
 Safar be Chazabeh | 1995 
 Born loser (original title: Pakbakhteh) | 1994 
 Crossing the Red Line (original title: Oboor az khat-e sorkh) | 1994 
 Sunshine Man (original title: mard-e Aftabi) | 1994 
 The Moon And The Sun (original title:Mah o khorshid) | 1994 
 The Last Port (original title: Akharin bandar) | 1994 
 Roya-ye nime-shab-e tabestan | 1994 
 The Indian Gift (original title: Tohfe-ye Hend) | 1994 
 A man, A Bear (original title: Yek mard, yek khers) | 1994 
 The Blue-Veiled (original title: Rusari Abi) | 1993 
 Khaneh Khalvat | 1993 
 Shaheed-e-Kufa | 1992 
 Tranzit | 1992 
 Rooz-e fereshte | 1993 
 Raz-e Gol-e Shab bo | 1992 
 The Bait (original title: To'me) | 1992 
 Ayalvar | 1992 
 The Actor (original title: Honarpisheh) | 1992 
 The Song of Tehran (original title: Avaz-e Tehran) | 1992 
 Baziche | 1992 
 Del shodegan | 1992 
 Dadsetan | 1991 
 Secret of the Red Fountain (original title:Raz-e cheshme-ye sorkh) | 1991 
 The Big Circus (original title: Sirk-e Bozorg) | 1991 
 School of old men (original title: Madreseye piremardha) | 1991 
 Nassereddin Shah, Actor-e Cinema | 1991 
 Narges | 1991 
 Hoor in Fire (original title: Hoor dar Atash) | 1991 
 The Secret of the Dagger (original title: Raz-e Khanjar) | 1990 
 The magic Trip (original title: Safar-e Jadooee) | 1990 
 The Bride (original title: Aroos) | 1990 
 Galan | 1990 
 Apartment No. 13 (original title: Apartmane shomare 13) | 1990 
 Dozd aroosakha | 1990 
 Hamoun | 1990 
 Swim in Winter (original title: Shena dar zemestan) | 1990 
 The Last Fly (original title: Akharin Parvaz) | 1989 
 Bagh-e Seyed | 1989 
 Contact (original title: Tamas) | 1989 
 All The Temptations of Earth (original title: Tamam-e Vasvase-haye Zamin) | 1989 
 Bunning Spruce (original title: Senobar-haye Soozan) | 1989 
 The Mother (original title: Madar) | 1989 
 Nakhlestan-e Teshne | 1989 
 Savalan | 1989 
 Rajaee School (original title: Madrese-ye Rajaee) | 1989 
 Night of the incident (original title: Shab-e Hadese) | 1989 
 The Heritage (original title: Ersieh) | 1988 
 The Horizon (original title: ofogh) | 1988 
 Canary Yellow | 1988 
 Tooba | 1988 
 Marriage of the Chosen (original title: Arousi-ye Khouban) | 1988 
 The Pit (original title: Godal) | 1988 
 Little Bird of Happiness (original title: Parande-ye khoochak-e Khoshbakhti) | 1988 
 Shadows of sorrow (original title: Saye-haye Gham) | 1988 
 The Crisis (original title: Bohran) | 1987 
 The Train (original title: Teran) | 1987 
 Jafar Khan az farang bargashte | 1987 
 House like a Town (original title: Khaneh-i mesl-e shahr) | 1987 
 Trace on Sand (original title: rad-e paee bar shen) | 1987 
 The Lost (original title: Gomshodegan) | 1987 
 Punishment (original title: Mokafat) | 1987 
 The Stranger (original title: Gharibeh) | 1987 
 The Blade and the Silk (original title: Tigh o Abrisham) | 1987 
 The Cyclist (original title: Bicycleran) | 1987 
 Dar jostejuye ghahraman | 1987 
 Report of a Murder (original title: Gozaresh-e yek ghatl) | 1987 
 Captain Khorshid (original title: nakhoda Khorshid) | 1987 
 Payizan | 1987 
 The Organization (original title: Tashkilat) | 1986 
 The Last Image (original title: Tasvir-e Akhar) | 1986 
 Tirbaran | 1986 
 The Peddler: First Episode (original title: Dast Foroosh: Episode Aval) | 1986 
 The Peddler: Second Episode (original title: Dast Foroosh: Episode Dovom) | 1986 
 Story of Life (original title: Ghese-ye zendegi) | 1986 
 The Pathway (original title: Gozargah) | 1986 
 The Mission (original title: Ma’moriat) | 1986 
 Harim-e Mehrvarzi | 1986 
 Beside the Lake (original title: Kenar-e Berke ha) | 1986 
 The Boycott (original title: Baykot) | 1985 
 The Cold Roads (original title: Jadehaye Sard) | 1985 
 The Tornado (original title: Gerdbaad) | 1985 
 The Detrition (original title: Avar) | 1985 
 Night Breaker (original title: Shab Shekan) | 1984 
 The Escape (original title: Farar) | 1984 
 Ste’aze | 1984 
 Kamalolmolk | 1984 
 Golhaye Davoudi | 1984 
 Do Cheshman Beesu | 1984 
 Tohfeha | 1984 
 Soil and Blood (original title: Khak o Khoon) | 1983 
 Shilat | 1983 
 Death of Yazdgerd (original title: Marg Yazdgerd) | 1982 
 Goft har se nafareshan | 1980 
 Flight in Cage (original title: Parvaz Dar Ghafas) | 1980 
 Salandar | 1980 
 Tall Shadows of the Wind (original title: Sayehaye bolande bad) | 1978 
 The Smell of Wheat (original title: Boo-ye Gandom) | 1978 
 The Grey (original title: Khakestari) | 1977 
 Along the Night (original title: Dar Emtedad Shab) | 1977 
 The Idol (original title: Bot) | 1976 
 The Iconoclast (original title: BotShekan) | 1976 
 Speeding naked till high noon (original title: Berehne ta zohr ba sorat) | 1976 
 Divine One (original title: Malakout) | 1976 
 The Deer (original title: Gavaznha) | 1976 
 Zabih | 1975 
 Night of Foreigners (original title: Shab-e Ghariban) | 1975 
 The Hive (original title: Kandou) | 1975 
 Nazanin | 1975 
 The Secret of the Treasure of the Jinn Valley (original title: Asrar ganj dareheye jenni) | 1974

Television series
 Mokhtarnameh | 2010-2011 
 Ashpazbashi | 2009-2010 
 Zero Degree Turn (original title: Madare sefr darajeh)| 2007 
 Under the Blade (original title: Zire Tigh) | 2006 
 Shahr Ashoob | 2005 
 The Third Sense (original title: Hes-e Sevom) | 2005 
 Mashgh-e Eshgh | 2004 
 Night of Nights (original title: Shab-i az shab-ha) | 2004 
 Lost Impeccability (original title: Masoomiyat Az Dast Rafte)| 2002-2003 
 The Green Journey (original title: Safar-e Sabz)| 2001 
 Lost (original title: Gomgashteh)| 2001 
 Neighbors (original title: Hamsaye ha)| 2000 
 The English Bag (original title: Kif-e Englisi) | 1999 
 Muzzle-loading Gun (original title: Tofang-e Sarpor) | 1999-2001 
 Apartment No.13 (original title: Aparteman-e shomareh 13) | 1990 
 [Shaheed-e-Kufa|[Imam Ali]] | 1997-1998 
 Once Upen a time (original title: Roozi Roozegari) | 1991 
 Masal Abad | 1984 
 Amir Kabir | 1984 
 Hezar Dastan | 1978-1987 
 My Uncle Napoleon (original title: Dai jan Napelon) | 1976 
 Braves of Tangestan (original title: Daliran-e Tangestan) | 1974 
 Headsman Cries (original title: Dezhkhim migeryad) | 1973

Theater 
 Gold Teeth (original title: Dandoon Tala) | 2001 
 Eshgh Abad

International TV Series 
 Zayed & The Dream (original title: Zayed va roya) | 2008 | Abu Dhabi
 Cup of Blood (original title: Fenjan al-dam) | 2007 | Syria TV
 Sallahedin | 2001 | Syria TV

Awards 
 Crystal Simorgh of Best Make-up from 8th Fajr International Film Festival For "Mother" (original title: Madar) | 1989 
 Crystal Simorgh of Best Make-up from 10th Fajr International Film Festival For "Nassereddin Shah, Actor-e Cinema" | 1991 
 Crystal Simorgh of Best Make-up from 13th Fajr International Film Festival For "The Fateful Day" (original title: Ruz-e vagh'e) | 1995 
 Crystal Simorgh of Best Make-up from 16th Fajr International Film Festival For "Sahereh" | 1996 
 Crystal Simorgh of Best Make-up from 19th Fajr International Film Festival For "Passenger From Rey" (original title: Mosafere rey) | 2000 
 Crystal Simorgh of lifetime Achievement at 23rd Fajr International Film Festival For Commemoration and Appreciation For years of distinguished | 2003
 Award of Best Make-up from 2nd House of Cinema Festival For "Baanoo" | 1999 
 Award of Best Make-up from 15th House of Cinema Festival For "A cube of sugar" (original title: Ye habe ghand) | 2011 
 Commemoration and Appreciation from 2nd large Celebration of Actors | 2003
 Award of Best Make-up Artist from Film report Magazin | 1997
 Award of Best Make-up Artist from Film report Magazin | 1994
 Honorary diploma of Best Make-up Artist from 4th Cima Festival | 1994
 Certificate of Best Make-up Artist from official Iran TV (Seda va Sima) for The English Bag (original title: Kif-e Englisi | 1999 
 Award of Best Make-up Artist from Dubai Film Festival
 Award of Best Make-up from Syria Film Festival For "Cup of Blood" (original title: Fenjan al-dam) | 2007 | Syria TV
 Award of Best Make-up Artist from Adonia Film Festival of Syria | 2011
 Award of Best Artistic Achievement for "Lantouri" | 2017

References

External links

 Official website
 
 sourehcinema.com Persian

1945 births
Living people
Iranian make-up artists
People from Tehran